Stories to Stay Awake is a Spanish horror anthology television series consisting of a reboot of the series of the same name created by Chicho Ibáñez Serrador and broadcast on TVE from 1966 to 1982. It was released on Amazon Prime Video on 5 November 2021 and it is slated to air on RTVE in the future. The four parts are directed by Rodrigo Cortés, Rodrigo Sorogoyen, Paco Plaza and Paula Ortiz.

Cast

Production and release 
Historias para no dormir is based on the series of the same name created and directed by Chicho Ibáñez Serrador, which aired from 1962 to 1968 and in 1982. Produced by VIS (a division of ViacomCBS Networks), Prointel and Isla Audiovisual for Amazon Prime Video and RTVE, the series consists of 4 self-contained episodes featuring a running time of around 50 minutes.

"La broma" was directed and written by Rodrigo Cortés; "El doble" was directed by Rodrigo Sorogoyen and written by Sorogoyen alongside Daniel Remón; "Freddy" was directed by Paco Plaza and written by Plaza alongside Alberto Marini; and "El asfalto" was directed by Paula Ortiz and written by Manuel Jabois alongside Rodrigo Cortés.

On 7 October 2021, Amazon Prime Video released a trailer and set a release date for 5 November 2021.

Distributed by ViacomCBS International Studios in Spain, Portugal, Italy and Latin America, ZDF Enterprises acquired the international distribution rights elsewhere.

The four episodes were presented at the 54th Sitges Film Festival in October 2021.

In February 2022, VIS announced the renovation of the series for a second season, with episodes directed by Jaume Balagueró, Nacho Vigalondo, Salvador Calvo and Alice Waddington. Shooting of the episode "El trasplante", directed by Calvo, co-written by Ignacio del Moral, and starring Javier Gutiérrez, Petra Martínez, Carlos Cuevas and Ramón Barea, was already underway.

Balagueró's episode "El televisor" (written alongside ) shot afterwards, starring Pablo Derqui and Manuela Vellés.

Episodes

Accolades 

|-
| align = "center" | 2021 || 27th Forqué Awards || colspan = "2" | Best Fiction Series ||  || 
|-
| rowspan = "2" align = "center" | 2022 || 9th Feroz Awards || colspan = "2" | Best Drama Series ||  || 
|-
| 28th Forqué Awards || colspan = "2" | Best Fiction Series ||  || 
|-
| align = "center" | 2023 || 31st Actors and Actresses Union Awards || Best Television Actor in a Secondary Role || Carlos Cuevas ||  || 
|}

References

External links
 

Amazon Prime Video original programming
Spanish-language television shows
Spanish horror fiction television series
2020s Spanish drama television series
Horror anthologies
Spanish anthology television series
2021 Spanish television series debuts
2020s horror television series